Capita plc, commonly known as Capita, is an international business process outsourcing and professional services company headquartered in London.

It is the largest business process outsourcing and professional services company in the United Kingdom, with an overall market share of 29% in 2016, and has clients in central government, local government and the private sector. It also has a property and infrastructure consultancy division which is the fourth largest multidisciplinary consultancy in the UK. Roughly half of its turnover comes from the private sector and half from the public sector. Whilst UK-focused, Capita also has operations across Europe, Africa and Asia.

Capita is listed on the London Stock Exchange.

History
Capita was formed in 1984, as a division of the non-profit CIPFA (Chartered Institute of Public Finance and Accountancy). In 1987, it became an independent company with 33 staff as a result of a management buy-out, led by Rod Aldridge, and was first listed on the London Stock Exchange in 1991.

In March 2006, Executive Chairman Rod Aldridge resigned in the aftermath of claims that contracts awarded to the Group were influenced by his loan of £1 million to the Labour Party. Aldridge resigned saying that he denied the claims, but to avoid any lingering doubts about it, he was leaving the company. Aldridge had overseen the company's growth from a small company in 1987 to a FTSE 100 member in 2006. He was replaced by his longtime associate Paul Pindar.

In February 2007, a Capita office in Victoria, London was subject to a letter bomb attack. One person was injured.

On 2 October 2009, one of Capita's businesses (Capita Financial Group) announced plans to move some of its operations from London to Leeds.

On 1 July 2011, Capita acquired Ventura, a customer contact specialist for a cash consideration of £65 million.
On 28 February 2013, Capita bought the Fire Service College from the Department for Communities and Local Government for £10 million.

In 2014, Pindar stepped down as chief executive. He was replaced by Andy Parker.

The company acquired Avocis, a German call centre business, in 2015, Orange Bus, a specialist digital interaction agency, in 2016 and NYS Corporate events and travel agency in 2017.

In October 2017, the company announced that former Amec Foster Wheeler CEO Jonathan Lewis would take over as CEO from 1 December 2017, following departure of Andy Parker. After completing an initial assessment, on 31 January 2018, Lewis announced a profits warning, dividend suspension, a £700 million rights issue, cost cutting and a disposals programme, as net debts were predicted to hit £1.15 billion and a pensions deficit reached £381 million. The announcement knocked 47% off Capita's shares, reducing its market value by over £1.1 billion. The share price slide continued the following day, losing a further 13%. On 3 April 2018, Capita shares fell 6% to a 20-year low after British Airways decided to retain in-house operation of two UK call centres rather than award contracts to run them to Capita.
On 23 April 2018, Capita launched a cash call to raise £701m and reported a £513m loss for the previous financial year. On 1 August 2018, Capita announced its profits in the six months to 30 June had dropped to £80.5m (from £195m in the same period in 2017), while revenues were down 4% to £1.98bn; the company's shares fell almost 9% after markets opened, to 148p a share.

Following Lewis's appointment, the company embarked on a "multi-year strategy" to turn around the company. In May 2019, the company became the first FTSE 250 company in 30 years to appoint rank-and-file workers to its board. Lyndsay Browne, a chartered accountant and finance manager, and Joseph Murphy, a project manager in the real estate division, beat competition from other internal candidates to become the first workers' representatives on the Capita board.

In September 2019, the company announced that it was re-branding as a "purpose-led" living wage employer, changing its logo for the first time in 13 years. The company said that from April 2020, it will pay all 40,000 of its employees an independently verified "real living wage". This will involve a pay rise for almost 6,000 employees. The rates, which are set at the basic income needed to cover the real cost of living, are overseen by the Living Wage Commission.

Operations

Consultancy division
In July 2019, the company announced that it was launching a consultancy arm. The new division will employ around 1,000 consultants and compete with the likes of Accenture, Deloitte and KPMG.

Healthcare recruitment 
Capita entered the healthcare recruitment market during May 2011, through acquisition of Team24, a healthcare recruitment specialist owned by Robert Stiff extending the services offered within the recruitment industry.

Capita Financial Administrators
In 2006, Capita Financial Administrators (CFA) was fined £300,000 by the Financial Services Authority for having poor anti-fraud controls. The division provides administration services for third parties and the Capita Group.

Legal Services
Capita also intended to enter into the legal services market and entered into a funding arrangement with the Law Firm Optima Legal Services Limited which saw them, in the period between May 2006, to the end of 2009, invest a total of £36,700,000 by way of investment loans into Optima. As part of the funding arrangement Capita Group had the option of acquiring the shares of Optima Legal Services for the nominal sum of £1 upon the full implementation of the Legal Services Act 2007, which would make ownership of law firms by the likes of Capita possible. It is thought that such Alternative Business Structures ("ABS") could be lawful around October 2011. However, on 9 August 2010, it was reported that the Solicitors Regulatory Authority ("SRA") had found that the arrangement breached its rules in that it effectively amounted to an ABS. As a consequence, Optima Legal Services Lead Litigation and Property Partners, Philip Robinson and Anthony Ruane respectively were both severely reprimanded by the SRA for what was found to be professional misconduct and only narrowly avoided referral to the Solicitors Disciplinary Tribunal and Adrian Lamb, former CEO of Optima Legal Services Limited, left the business in June 2010.

Constructionline
In 1998, Capita won the contract to run Constructionline, the newly created Public-Private Partnership owned by the Department for Business, Innovation and Skills (BIS). In January 2015, Capita acquired Constructionline outright from BIS for £35m. Three years later, on 31 January 2018, Capita announced it wanted to sell Constructionline as part of a transformation programme including disposal of non-core assets and cost cutting. In June 2018, it was reported that Constructionline had been sold to private equity investor Warburg Pincus for £160m.

NHS Services
In June 2014, it was reported that at least five of eight Liverpool NHS Trusts which had contracted their payroll and recruitment to Capita in 2012, were withdrawing because of concerns about the quality of the service provided. Several NHS trusts contracted with the company for human resources services. West London Mental Health NHS Trust cancelled their contract in September 2014, after the company proved "unable to meet acceptable 'time to hire' targets", particularly for nurses. At the same time Alder Hey Children's NHS Foundation Trust and Liverpool Heart and Chest Hospital NHS Foundation Trust terminated their contracts.

In November, Mersey Care Trust revealed that "information governance issues" had been uncovered when the services were taken back in-house. Details of staff at other Merseyside trusts were sent to Liverpool Community Health Trust's HR department.

The company was awarded a 4-year contract to become sole provider of administrative services including payment administration, management of medical records and eligibility lists of practitioners for GPs, opticians and dentists across the UK by NHS England in June 2015. In July 2016, it was reported that there was "a large backlog of unprocessed correspondence relating to patients". It was earlier reported that the company was unable to deal "effectively" with the movement of paper records between practices.

In 2015, an undercover investigation by The Daily Telegraph showed that in some cases locum agencies, Medicare and Team24 owned by Capita were charging some hospitals higher fees than others and giving false company details. The agencies were charging up to 49% of the fee. Health secretary Jeremy Hunt criticised agencies who sought "big profits" at the expense of the NHS and taxpayers and promised to "reduce the margins rip-off agencies are able to generate."

The company established Primary Care Support England in September 2015, replacing former regional services provided by each local health authority. The new service was described as shambolic by the Local Optical Committee Support Unit and the Optical Confederation. A deal was negotiated to enable optician practices to claim interest, administrative costs and bank charges on late payments of General Ophthalmic Services fees by Capita. In August 2016, a survey of GPs found 85% were missing records of recently registered patients, 65% had experienced shortages of clinical supplies or delays in deliveries, and 32% had suffered from missed or delayed payments. Delays in the payment of GP trainees' salaries were also reported. The situation was repeated in October 2017, with The Guardian reporting that "hundreds" of trainee GPs had not been paid. Capita was unable to say how many were affected in what the Cameron fund – a GP hardship charity – blamed on "another botched privatisation." Inadequacies by Capita may have put patients at risk. The National Audit Office maintains almost 90 women were told incorrectly they were no longer in the cervical screening programme. Patients could have been at risk due to trouble with the 'performers list' a list of NHS dentists, GP's and opticians. "The failure to update performers lists may have compromised patient safety in cases where practitioners should have been removed," the report authors maintained. Roughly 1,000 dentists, doctors and opticians could not work in 2016 due to delays processing new applications. Further failures included a backlog of 500,000 patient registration letters, failure to deliver medical supplies, and patients' medical records being lost or delayed.

In March 2019, Simon Stevens announced that the cervical screening programme administration they had been running would be brought back in house.

Education services
 SIMS.net – Schools Information Management Software a Management information system used in 70% of primary and secondary schools across England and Wales to record many aspects of pupil data. In March 2009, Capita SIMS was said to be responsible for sending a truancy warning notice to the family of a Cheshire school pupil who had died two months before. SIMS also links with Capita One (through a process called B2B), which is a database used within Local Education Authorities for general analysis and overview of pupil and school data.
 Individual Learning Account – A £290million scheme intended to give financial support to adult learners that was opened in 2000, and scrapped in 2001, following widespread and massive fraud.
 Connexions Card – A £109million scheme that involved issuing 16- to 19-year-olds with smart cards that recorded their lesson attendance and rewarded them with discounts on consumer goods. It ran from 2002, until it was terminated in 2006, owing to lack of uptake.
 Education Maintenance Allowance for the Learning and Skills Council.
 Capita Education Resourcing – Capita Education Resourcing is an education recruitment specialist with a large networks of schools, colleges and nurseries across England and Wales. They have 19 offices covering teaching jobs operating throughout the UK.

Irish postcodes
In 2014, Capita were awarded the contract to introduce postcodes to the Republic of Ireland. The Irish communications minister has welcomed the implementation saying that the Irish code is the first in the world to be unique to each individual address. The scheme was launched in July 2015.

The emergency services have expressed concern that the new system may lead to responders having difficulty getting to incidents. Further, the Irish Data Protection Authority has raised concerns over the design of the code as information about individuals will be made more accessible. Liam Duggan, CEO of Capita Ireland stated at a Government enquiry in 2014, that they had thoroughly tested the new system for unsuitable words and even used a game of Scrabble for this purpose.

The project is generally running to programme and budget: roll out, which was originally planned to start in March 2015, will now take place in "mid-2015" and the cost, which was originally budgeted at €25 million has increased to €27 million.

Ministry of Defence Services
In 2012, Capita was awarded a 10 year long recruiting contract for the British Army, worth £1.3 billion. However, they have been greatly criticised, as they failed to meet the army's recruiting target every year up until 2020, with the shortfall ranging between 21% and 45% every single year. According to the National Audit Office one of the main failings of the contract was the new recruiting website, that was delivered in 2017- four years late and three times the original cost. In 2020, the contract was extended for two further years, meaning that it will now terminate in 2024. The Public Accounts Committee stated that Capita entered into the contract without "understanding the complexity of what it was taking on."

In 2019, Capita won a 12-year contract to operate the Defence Fire and Rescue Service, at 53 sites across the UK, Cyprus, and the Falkland Islands, in a deal worth £525 million. The deal also saw Capita take over all the work of the Defence Fire Training and Development Centre and transfer it to the national Fire Service College- including Royal Air Force firefighter training. However, Capita once more was subject to criticism when it proposed to cut firefighter numbers at HMNB Clyde and RNAD Coulport, two nuclear warhead facilities, by 15% less than two years after the contract was awarded. This was described as a purely cost-cutting measure, as the firm is set to request the Scottish Fire and Rescue Service to backfill the gaps in response.

In 2020, an industry consortium led by Capita, called Fisher Training won a contract to deliver shore-based training to the Royal Navy and Royal Marines at 16 sites across the UK. The consortium is composed of Capita, Raytheon UK, Elbit Systems UK, and Fujitsu, and the contract is worth up to £2 billion.

Criticism
Capita Group has not been received well by the public and in the media. It has gained the nickname "Crapita", particularly from the coverage in the satirical and current affairs magazine Private Eye, which routinely documents the company's many failures and setbacks in the public sector.

It was revealed in January 2013 that Capita was embroiled in a scandal over misinforming people that they had to leave the UK as they had no valid visa. One such person was, in fact, the holder of a UK passport.

In 2014, a leak to The Guardian revealed that the Department for Work and Pensions (DWP) had to send civil servants in to help the company process personal independence payments for the seriously ill and the disabled. "Waiting times for assessment," the newspaper noted, "have been so long that in some cases people with terminal conditions have died before receiving a penny."

The 2015 sale of a government research operation charged with overlooking food safety to Capita has been criticized by Tim Lang, an advisor to the UK government and the WHO on food safety issues. Arguing that a for-profit operation will be under pressure to ignore low-paying projects vital to public safety and the environment, he indicates that there is no profit in public research concerning food and biodiversity or food and pesticide residues, and predicts "commercial concerns will skew Fera's priorities"

Former Liberal Democrat leader Tim Farron questioned how Atos and Capita could have been paid over £500m from taxpayers money for assessing fitness to work as 61% who appealed won their appeals. Farron stated, "This adds to the suspicion that these companies are just driven by a profit motive, and the incentive is to get the assessments done, but not necessarily to get the assessments right. They are the ugly face of business."

Controversies
In September 2021, it was revealed that Capita had been paying thousands of its employees below the minimum wage.

References

External links 
 
 

Business services companies established in 1984
Business services companies of the United Kingdom
Companies based in the City of Westminster
Companies listed on the London Stock Exchange
Private providers of NHS services
British companies established in 1984